Mlabri is a language spoken by the Mlabri people in the border area between Thailand and Laos.

It is usually classified as a Khmuic language, a subgroup of the Austroasiatic languages. Linguist Jørgen Rischel has studied the language and described its peculiarities in several works.  He divides the language into three varieties: one spoken by a small group in Laos and previously called Yumbri, and two others spoken by larger groups in Thailand. They differ in intonation and in lexicon.

Although it is possible to count up to ten in Mlabri, only the numerals one and two may be used to modify a noun, and the word for 'two' has uses closer to 'pair' or 'couple' in English than a numeral.

Phonology
Mlabri distinguishes rounding in its back vowels. It does not have the register systems of some other Austroasiatic languages. 

All vowels occur long and short. /a/ is fronted after palato-alveolar consonants, and may approach . There is also a very short vowel  that has limited distribution. Schwas occur in pre-tonic syllables, but may be epenthetic. There are several diphthongs. 

Consonants include the two implosive stops /ɓ/ and /ɗ/, attested in words such as ɓuʔ 'slow' and ɗɤŋ 'can'. These apparent implosive stops could be analyzed as pre-glottalized stops, as pre-glottalization is also a used for sonorants. Consonants also include voiceless sonorants, as in m̥ɛʔ 'new', n̥taʔ 'tail', ŋ̊uh 'sit', l̥ak '(there is) none', or w̥ep 'shoulder'. Arguably, these could be analyzed as a sequence of /h/ and a sonorant. 

 is only attested in minor syllables. 

Mlabri has a different set of consonants which occur at the ends of syllables, including aspirated sonorants . The second is a trill, and the third more post-alveolar than palatal. Other final consonants are

References

Further reading
 Rischel, Jørgen, Minor Mlabri. A Hunter-Gatherer Language of Northern Indochina, 1995, .
 Rischel, Jørgen, Pan-dialectal databases: Mlabri, an oral Mon–Khmer language, 2004 May, Lexicography Conference, Chiangmai.
 Schliesinger, Joachim, Ethnic Groups of Laos, vol. 2, White Lotus 2000,

External links
 Jørgen Rischel, In what sense is Mlabri a West Khmuic language?
 http://projekt.ht.lu.se/rwaai RWAAI (Repository and Workspace for Austroasiatic Intangible Heritage)
 http://hdl.handle.net/10050/00-0000-0000-0003-66E5-6@view Mlabri in RWAAI Digital Archive

Languages of Thailand
Khmuic languages
Languages of Laos
Endangered Austroasiatic languages